Jean Louis (born Jean Louis Berthault; October 5, 1907 – April 20, 1997) was a French-American costume designer. He won an Academy Award for The Solid Gold Cadillac (1956).

Life and career
Before coming to Hollywood, he worked in New York for fashion entrepreneur Hattie Carnegie, where the clientele included Joan Cohn, the wife of Columbia Pictures studio chief Harry Cohn.

He worked as head designer for Columbia Pictures from 1944 to 1960. His most famous works include Rita Hayworth's black satin strapless dress from Gilda (1946), Marlene Dietrich's celebrated beaded souffle stagewear for her cabaret world tours, as well as the sheer, sparkling gown that Marilyn Monroe wore when she sang "Happy Birthday, Mr. President" to John F. Kennedy in 1962.

The dress was so tight that he is believed to have actually sewn it while Monroe was wearing it. The idea of a dress being a nude color, with crystals coating it, stunned audiences. It gave the illusion that Monroe was nude, except for discretely placed rhinestones covering her head to toe.

Louis had originally designed a version of the dress for Marlene Dietrich, who wore it in her concert shows. An impressed Monroe asked Dietrich about it, who told her how the dress's illusion worked, and sent her to Louis to design a similar dress for her Kennedy appearance. While Dietrich had been seen wearing her version before Monroe, the press coverage surrounding Monroe's appearance at Madison Square Garden in her style of gown swept the globe. This robe became—besides the white one from "The Seven Year Itch"—Marilyn Monroe's most famous robe, selling at auction in 2016 for 4.8 million dollars.

In 1993, four years after the death of his second wife, Louis married former client Loretta Young; they remained married until his death in 1997. He had designed Young's wardrobe for her TV program The Loretta Young Show (1953–61), an anthology show noted for Young's show-opening and closing scenes that had viewers tuning in especially to view her high-fashion outfit for that week. Young was known as  the best-dressed actress in America at that time.

For over forty years, Louis designed clothes for almost every star in Hollywood. Around sixty of his designs appeared in movies, and he was eventually nominated for 13 Academy Awards. Some of his clients included Ginger Rogers, Irene Dunne, Lana Turner, Vivien Leigh, Joan Crawford, Julie Andrews, Katharine Hepburn, and Judy Garland. Some of his film credits included, A Star Is Born, Ship of Fools, From Here to Eternity, Thoroughly Modern Millie, and he won an Oscar for his designs in The Solid Gold Cadillac in 1956.

In 1937, a year after Louis immigrated to the United States, he designed the Carnegie suit, a suit that became an icon in the fashion world. The Carnegie suit was one of the first fashions to become very well-liked as an American name design, and its fitted blazer and long pencil skirt was worn by several actresses and society women at the time.

The Duchess of Windsor became one of his most famous clients, as well as the First Lady Nancy Reagan in the 1980s.

Academy Award nominations
 1950 – Film: Born Yesterday
 1952 – Film: Affair in Trinidad
 1953 – Film: From Here to Eternity
 1954 – Film: It Should Happen to You
 1954 – Film: A Star Is Born
 1955 – Film: Queen Bee
 1956 – Film: The Solid Gold Cadillac;  Won
 1957 – Film: Pal Joey
 1958 – Film: Bell, Book and Candle
 1961 – Film: Judgment at Nuremberg
 1961 – Film: Back Street
 1965 – Film: Ship of Fools
 1966 – Film: Gambit
 1967 – Film: Thoroughly Modern Millie

Actresses designed for

Rita Hayworth in Tonight and Every Night, 1945, Gilda, 1946, Down To Earth, 1947, The Lady from Shanghai, 1948, The Loves of Carmen, 1948, Affair in Trinidad, 1952, Miss Sadie Thompson and Salome, 1953                                               
Irene Dunne in Together Again, 1944
Claudette Colbert in Tomorrow is Forever 1946
Judy Holliday in Born Yesterday, 1950  and The Solid Gold Cadillac, 1956 
Lucille Ball in The Magic Carpet, 1951                                  
Gloria Grahame in The Big Heat, 1953
Deborah Kerr in From Here to Eternity, 1953                             
Judy Garland in A Star is Born, 1954                         
Joan Crawford in Queen Bee, 1955               
Betty Grable in Three for the Show, 1955
Kim Novak in Picnic, 1955, and Bell, Book, and Candle, 1958                              
 Kim Novak and Rita Hayworth in Pal Joey, 1957
Lana Turner in Imitation of Life, 1959                   
Doris Day in Pillow Talk (1959), The Thrill of It All (1962), Send Me No Flowers (1964) and Ballad of Josie (1968)                      
Loretta Young for The Loretta Young Show, Television series, 1953-1961
Marlene Dietrich in The Monte Carlo Story, 1956, and Judgment at Nuremberg, 1961
Susan Hayward in Back Street, 1961
Marilyn Monroe in The Misfits, 1961, and Something's Got to Give (unfinished), 1962
Vivien Leigh in Ship of Fools, 1965
Shirley MacLaine in Gambit, 1966
Julie Andrews, Mary Tyler Moore, and Carol Channing in Thoroughly Modern Millie, 1967
Eva Gabor for Green Acres  Television series, 1965-1967
Barbara Bel Geddes for Dallas  Television series, 1978-1984 and 1985-1990

References 

Hollywood Costume Design/ David Chierchetti, author  
In A Glamorous Fashion: The Fabulous Years Of Hollywood Costume Design/ W.Robert Lavine, author

External links 

 

1907 births
1997 deaths
French costume designers
American costume designers
Best Costume Design Academy Award winners
French emigrants to the United States